Alejandro Fernández Portillo (born 6 November 1992) is a Spanish footballer who plays for Antequera CF.

References

External links
Álex Portillo at La Preferente

1992 births
Living people
Spanish footballers
Segunda División B players
Málaga CF players
Marbella FC players
Jönköpings Södra IF players
IF Elfsborg players
Allsvenskan players
Association football defenders
Spanish expatriate footballers
Expatriate footballers in Sweden
Spanish expatriate sportspeople in Sweden